Hannah Roberts (born August 10, 2001) is an American BMX freestyle cyclist. She is a three time world champion in the UCI Urban Cycling World Championships and silver medalist in freestyle BMX at the Tokyo 2020 Olympics.

Early life 
Roberts was born in South Bend, Indiana. Roberts’ mother is Betty Roberts. Roberts grew up in Buchanan, Michigan where she graduated from Buchanan High School in 2019.

Roberts began riding BMX at age 9. Roberts entered her first BMX competition in 2012.

Career

Urban World Championships 
In 2017, Roberts competed in Chengdu, China at the UCI Urban Cycling World Championships where she won gold and became world champion. After earning bronze in 2018, Roberts won her second BMX world title in 2019 and a third world title in 2021.

Olympics 
Roberts became the first American to qualify in BMX freestyle for the 2020 Summer Olympics, for the first Olympics the event would be included Going into the event, Roberts was seeded first and was a favorite to win. She had the highest score in the first round with a score of 96.10. For her second run, she needed to improve to a score of 97.50 to win gold, but after a poor landing she stopped the run, accepting a silver medal.

Personal life 
Roberts married Kelsey Miller in January 2021 and has thanked her for her support while training for the Olympics.

References

External links 
 
 Hannah Roberts at USA Cycling
 

2001 births
Living people
American female cyclists
BMX riders
Cyclists at the 2019 Pan American Games
Pan American Games medalists in cycling
Pan American Games gold medalists for the United States
Medalists at the 2019 Pan American Games
Cyclists at the 2020 Summer Olympics
Medalists at the 2020 Summer Olympics
Olympic silver medalists for the United States in cycling
LGBT cyclists
American LGBT sportspeople
21st-century American women